Public expenditure is spending made by the government of a country on collective needs and wants of public goods and public services, such as pension, provisions, security, infrastructure, etc. Until the 19th century, public expenditure was limited as laissez faire philosophies believed that money left in private hands could bring better returns. In the 20th century, John Maynard Keynes argued that the role of public expenditure was pivotal in determining levels of income and distribution in the economy. Since then, government expenditures has shown an increasing trend. Sources of government revenue include taxes, and non-tax revenues.

In the 17th and the 18th centuries, public expenditure was considered a wastage of money. Thinkers believed government should stay with their traditional functions of spending on defense and maintaining law and order.

Theories of public expenditure

Several theories of taxation exist in public economics. Governments at all levels (national, regional and local) need to raise revenue from a variety of sources to finance public-sector expenditures. The details of taxation are guided by two principles: who will benefit, and who can pay. Public expenditure means the expenditure on the developmental and non-developmental activity such as construction of roadways and dams, and other activity.

Principle of maximum social advantage

 The criteria and pre-conditions for arriving at this solution are collectively referred to as the principle of maximum social advantage. 
Taxation (government revenue) and government expenditure are the two tools. Neither of excess is good for the society, it has to be balanced to achieve maximum social benefit. Dalton called this principle as “Maximum Social Advantage” and Pigou termed it as “Maximum Aggregate Welfare”.

Dalton’s Principle of Maximum Social Advantage – maximum satisfaction should be yield by striking a balance between public revenue and expenditure by the government. Economic welfare is achieved when marginal utility of expenditure = marginal disutility of taxation. He explains this principle with reference to 
	
 Maximum Social Benefit (MSB)
 Maximum Social Sacrifice (MSS)

It was introduced by Swedish Economist “Erik Lindahl in 1919”. According to his theory, determination of public expenditure and taxation will happen on the basis of public preferences which they will reveal themselves. Cost of supplying a good will be taken up by the people. The tax that they will pay will be revealed by them according to their capacities.

History

Before World War I 
At the end of the 19th century average public expenditure was around 10 percent of GDP. In USA it was only 7 percent and in countries like United Kingdom, Germany or Netherlands it did not exceed amount of 10 percent. Australia, Italy, Switzerland and France had public expenditure over 12 percent of GDP. It was considered as a significant involvement of government in economy. This average share of public expenditure increased to almost 12 percent before the start of World War I. Due to the World War I anticipation, the share increased quickly in Austria, France, United Kingdom or Germany.

Effect of World War I and interwar period 
The World War I caused a global growth of the public expenditure share in GDP. In United Kingdom, Germany, Italy and France, which were affected a lot by the war, the share of public expenditure even exceeded 25 percent. In interwar period the average share of the public expenditure was still slightly increasing. The United States increased its public expenditure with the New Deal. Other governments also increased public expenditure in order to create more employment. The increase was accelerated by World War II anticipation in the second part of the 30s among European countries. In 1937 the amount of average public expenditure share was between 22 and 23 percent, twice as much as before World War I. However, it is fair to mention that part of this increase of public expenditure share was caused by GDP fall. Most of industrialized countries had its GDP over 15 percent before the World War II. Only Australia, Norway and Spain had less than 15 percent of GDP.

World War II and post-war period 
From the start of the World War I until 1960 the average share of public expenditure in GDP increased slowly from 22 to 28 percent. Most of this increase was given by growth of military spending caused by World War II. Spain, Switzerland and Japan had their public expenditure still below 20 percent of their GDPs.

Second half of the 20th century. 
The average public expenditure, as a share of GDP, increased rapidly between years 1960 and 1980 from around 28 to 43 percent. No industrial country had this share below 30 percent in 1980. In Belgium, Sweden and Netherlands it was even over 50 percent. In last two decades of 20th century share of public expenditure kept increasing, but the growth significantly slowed down. In 1996 the average public expenditure was around 45 percent, which is in comparison with 1960-1980 period slow increase from year 1980. During 1980-1996 period the public expenditure share even declined in many countries, for example United Kingdom, Belgium, Netherlands etc.

Present 
Since the late 1980s, the average public expenditure to GDP ratio is increasing slowly. The only industrialized countries that reduced significantly are New Zealand, Ireland and Norway. One of the reasons is growing skepticism about governmental intervention in the economy.

Causes of growth of public expenditure
There are several factors that have led to an enormous increase in public expenditure through the years

1) Defense expenditure due to modernization of defense equipment by the navy, army and air force to prepare the country for war or for prevention causes-for-growth-of-public-expenditure.
 
2) Population growth – It increases with the increase in population, more of investment is required to be done by government on law and order, education, infrastructure, etc. investment in different fields depending on the different age group is required.

3) Welfare activities – welfare, mid-day meals, pension provisions etc.
 
 Provision of public and utility services – provision of basic public goods given by government (their maintenance and installation) such as transportation.
 Accelerating economic growth – in order to raise the standard of living of the people.
 Price rise – higher price level compels the government to spend an increased amount on purchase of goods and services.
 Increase in public revenue – with the rise in public revenue government is bound to increase the public expenditure.
 International obligation – maintenance of socio-economic obligation, cultural exchange etc. (these are indirect expenses of government)

4) Wars and social crises – fighting amongst people and communities, and prolonged drought or unemployment, earthquake, hurricanes or tornadoes may lead to an increase in public expenditure of a country. This is because it will involve governments to re-plan and allocate resources to finance the reconstruction.

5) Creation of super national organizations – E.g., the United Nations, NATO, European community and other multinational organizations that are responsible for the provision of public goods and services on an international basis, have to be financed out of funds subscribed by member states, thereby adding to their public expenditure.

6) Foreign aid – Acceptance by the richer industrialized countries of their responsibility to help the poor developing countries has channeled some of the increased public expenditure of the donor country into foreign aid programmes.

7) Inflation – This is the general rise in the price level of goods and services. It increases the cost of all activities of the public sector and thus a major factor in growth in money terms of public expenditure

Composition 
Public expenditure can be divided into COFOG (Classification of the Functions of Government) categories cetris pari bus. Those categories are

1.      Social protection – pensions, subsidies for family and children, unemployment subsidies, R&D (Research and Development) on social protection.

2.      Health - public health services, medical products, appliances and equipment, hospital services, R&D on healthcare.

3.      General Public Services - executive and legislative organs, financial and fiscal affairs, external affairs, foreign economic aid, public debt transactions, R&D related to general public services

4.      Education - pre-primary, primary, secondary, tertiary education, R&D on education etc.

5.      Economic Affairs - general economic, agriculture, fuel and energy, commercial and labour affairs, forestry, fishing and hunting, mining, manufacturing, transport, communication etc.

6.      Public order and safety - police, fire-protection services, law courts, prisons etc.

7.      Defence - military defence, civil defence, foreign military aid.

8.      Recreation, culture and religion – Recreational and sporting services, cultural services, broadcasting and publishing services, religious services etc.

9.      Environmental protection - waste management, pollution abatement, protection of biodiversity and landscape etc.

10.    Housing and community services - housing development, community development, water supply, street lighting etc.

European Union 
Public expenditures represented 46.7 percent of total GDP of the European Union in 2018. Countries with the highest percentage of public expenditure were France and Finland with 56 and 53 percent, respectively. The lowest percentage had Ireland with only 25 percent of its GDP. Among the countries of the European Union, the most important function in public expenditure is social protection. Almost 20 percent of GDP of European Union went to social protection in 2018. The highest ratio had Finland and France, both around 24 percent of their GDPs. The country with least social protection expenditure as percent of its GDP was Ireland with 9 percent. The second largest function in public expenditure is expenditure on health. The general government expenditure on health in European Union was over 7 percent of GDP in 2018. The country with highest share of health expenditure in 2018 Denmark with 8.4 percent. The least percentage had Cyprus with 2.7 percent. General public services had 6 percent of total GDP of European Union in 2018, Education around 4.6 percent and all other categories had less than 4.5 percent of the GDP.

Principles Governing Public Expenditure 
Rules or principles that govern the expenditure policy of the government are called canons of public expenditure. Findlay Shirras has laid down the following four canons of public expenditure:

1.Canon of Benefit – public spending must be done in a manner that it brings greatest social benefits.

2.Canon of Economy – it says that economy does not mean miserliness. Public expenditure must be made productively and efficiently.

3.Canon of Sanction – public spending should not be made without sanction of an appropriate authority.

4.Canon of Surplus – public expenditure should be done in a way avoiding deficit. Government must prepare budget to create a surplus.

5.Canon of elasticity- it says there should be enough scope in expenditure policy.government should be able to increase or decrease it according to the period. 
                             
6.Canon of productivity- public expenditure should encourage production efficiency of the economy.

7.Cannon of equitable distribution - expenditure policy should minimize inequalities and  it should be designed in a way to benefit  poorer sections.

See also
 Expenditure incidence
 Government spending

References

Public finance
Expenditure